Open-source hardware comprises computers and computer components with an open design. They are designed as open-source hardware using open-source principles.

Partially open-source hardware
Hardware that uses closed source components

Computers

Single-board computers
 Tinkerforge RED Brick, executes user programs and controls other Bricks/Bricklets standalone

ARM
 Banana Pi, uses low-power processors with an ARM core; runs Linux, Android, and OpenWRT
 BeagleBoard, uses low-power Texas Instruments processors with an ARM Cortex-A8 core; runs Ångström distribution (Linux)
 IGEPv2, an ARM OMAP 3-based board designed and manufactured by ISEE in Spain. Its expansion boards are also open-source.
 OLinuXino, designed with KiCad by OLIMEX Ltd in Bulgaria
 PandaBoard, a variation of the BeagleBoard
 Rascal, an ARM based Linux board that works with Arduino shields, with a web server that includes an editor for users to program it in Python. Hardware design files released under the Creative Commons BY-SA license.
 96Boards (includes but not limited to, DragonBoard 410c, HiKey, HiKey960, Bubblegum-96 and more...)
 Parallella single-board computer with a manycore coprocessor and field-programmable gate array (FPGA)

ATMega
 Arduino – open-source microcontroller board

Motorola 68000 series
 Minimig – a re-implementation of an Amiga 500 using a field-programmable gate array (FPGA).

National Semiconductor NS320xx series
 PC532, a personal computer design released in 1990, based on the NS32532 microprocessor

RISC-V
 HiFive1 is an Arduino-compatible development kit featuring the Freedom E310, the industry's first commercially available RISC-V SoC
 HiFive Unleashed is a Linux development platform for SiFive’s Freedom U540 SoC, the world’s first 4+1 64-bit multi-core Linux-capable RISC-V SoC."
 HiFive Unmatched is a mini-ITX motherboard that features "a SiFive FU740 processor coupled with 8 GB DDR4 memory and 32 MB SPI Flash. It comes with a 4x USB 3.2 ports and a 16x PCIe expansion slot."

Notebook computers
 Novena, a notebook computer that uses a 1.2 GHz quad-core Freescale processor closely coupled with a Xilinx FPGA
 VIA OpenBook, a netbook case design released by VIA Technologies

Handhelds, palmtops, and smartphones
 Ben NanoNote, a palmtop PC based on the MIPS architecture
 Openmoko, a smartphone containing a single-board computer equipped with a GSM/UMTS modem
 Simputer, a handheld computer released in 2002

Fully open-source hardware
Hardware that has no closed source dependencies

Microcontrollers
 Freeduino – an open-source physical computing platform based on a simple I/O board and a development environment that implements the open source Processing / Wiring language. Also clones of this platform including Freeduino.
 Tinkerforge – a platform comprising stackable microcontrollers for interfacing with sensors and other I/O devices.

Components
 Ethernut, embedded Ethernet adapters
 IOIO, a board that allows Android applications to interface with external electronics
 PLAICE, a device that combines a flash memory programmer, in-circuit emulation, and a multichannel logic analyzer. It runs uClinux.
 Tinkerforge, a platform comprising stackable microcontrollers for interfacing with sensors and other I/O devices
 Twibrigh RONJA, a 10 Mbit/s full duplex FSO wireless optical network adapter from 2001

CPUs
 Amber is an ARM-compatible 32-bit RISC processor. Amber implements the ARMv2 instruction set.
 LEON, a 32-bit, SPARC-like CPU created by the European Space Agency
 OpenPOWER, based on IBM's POWER8 and newer multicore processor designs
 OpenSPARC, a series of open-source microprocessors based on the UltraSPARC T1 and UltraSPARC T2 multicore processor designs
 Parallax P8X32A Propeller is a multicore microcontroller with an emphasis on general-purpose use
 ZPU, a small, portable CPU core with a GCC toolchain. It is designed to be compiled targeting FPGA
 Zet (hardware), x86 implementation on programmable logic
 OpenRISC 1200, an implementation of the open source OpenRISC 1000 RISC architecture

Related

Instruction sets
 J-Core, an implementation of the SuperH with some extensions
 MIPS 
 Power, which originated from IBM's POWER ISA
 RISC-V, a RISC ISA that originated in 2010 at the University of California, Berkeley
 SPARC

Organisations
 Bug Labs, a US technology company that began by developing and selling open-source hardware peripherals for rapid prototyping of electronics
 LowRISC, a not-for-profit organization that aims to develop open hardware
 M-Labs, developers of the Milkymist system on a chip
 Open Compute Project, an organization for sharing designs of data center products among companies
 Open Graphics Project, a project that aims to design a standard open architecture for graphics cards
 OpenCores, a loose community of designers that supports open-source cores (logic designs) for CPUs, peripherals and other devices. OpenCores maintains an open-source on-chip interconnection bus specification called Wishbone
 OpenRISC is a group of developers working to produce a very-high-performance open-source RISC CPU.

See also

References

External links
 h-node, a hardware database compiled by the FSF to identify devices that work with a fully free operating system

Open-source hardware
Hacker culture